Cross Park is a public park in Gladstone, Oregon, United States. The park is sometimes used for cliff-jumping.

References

External links

 Cross Park at the City of Gladstone Oregon

Gladstone, Oregon
Parks in Clackamas County, Oregon